The East India Company Act (EIC Act 1784), also known as Pitt's India Act, was an Act of the Parliament of Great Britain intended to address the shortcomings of the Regulating Act of 1773 by bringing the East India Company's rule in India under the control of the British Government. Named for British prime minister William Pitt the Younger, the act provided for the appointment of a Board of Control, and provided for a joint government of British India by the Company and the Crown with the government holding the ultimate authority. A six member board of control was set up for political activities and Court of directors for financial/commercial activities. As the Regulating Act had many defects, it was necessary to pass another Act to remove these defects.

Provisions of the 1784 Act
The Act provided for not more than six Privy Counsellors, including a Secretary of State and the Chancellor of the Exchequer to be appointed "Commissioners for the Affairs of India". Of these, not fewer than three formed a Board to execute the powers under the Act. 

The Board was presided over by the president, who soon effectively became the minister for the affairs of the East India Company. Section 3 of the Act provided that the President was to be the Secretary of State, or failing that, the Chancellor of the Exchequer, or failing that, the most senior of the other Commissioners.

The Act stated that the Board would henceforth "superintend, direct and control" the government of the Company's possessions, in effect controlling the acts and operations relating to the civil, military and revenues of the Company. 

The Board was supported by a Chief Secretary.

The governing council of the Company was reduced to three members. The governors of Bombay and Madras were also deprived of their independence. The governor-general was given greater powers in matters of war, revenue and diplomacy.

The Act also stated that to pursue schemes of conquest and extension of dominion in India are measures repugnant to the wish, the honour and the policy of this nation. (This would later change with the rise of Napoleon and French interest in India).

By a supplementary act passed in 1786 Lord Cornwallis was appointed as the 2nd governor-general of Bengal, and he then became the effective ruler of British India under the authority of the Board of Control and the Court of Directors. The constitution set up by Pitt's India Act did not undergo any major changes until the end of the company's rule in India in 1858.

General Information
The Pitt’s India Act in 1784, also known as the East India Company Act, was passed in British Parliament to correct the defects of the previously signed Regulating Act in 1773. The Regulating Act in 1773 was an Act of the Parliament of Great Britain that’s purpose was to overhaul the management of the East India Company’s rule in India. The Act proved to not be a long-term solution. The Regulating Act set up a system where it supervised the work of the Company but did not take power for itself. 

In 1781, both a selected and secret committee were set to go into the affairs of the Company. This selected committee searched into the relations between the Supreme Court and the Council in Bengal, while the secret committee caused the Maratha War. The reports they presented were openly used as an arsenal for weapons against the Company by party orators in Parliament. 

Pitt’s India Act established the system of dual control of India and these changes continued through 1858. The company’s territories In India were called the “British possession in India” for the first time. The British Government was given complete control over the Company’s affairs and its administration in India. In the dual system of control, the company was represented by the Court of Directors and the British Government by the Board of Control. The act mandated that all civil and military officers disclose their property in India and Britain within two months of their joining. The Governor-General’s council’s strength was reduced to three members. One of the three would be the Commander-in-Chief of the British Crown’s army in India. The Governor-General was given casting vote. The Presidencies of Madras and Bombay became subordinate to the Bengal Presidency. In effect, Calcutta became the capital of the British possessions in India. 

Once the Pitt’s India Act was signed in 1784, there was more government control under Prime Minister William Pitt. This new Act created a committee of six government appointees, known as the Board of Control, who were appointed to monitor and direct the Company’s policies. Minister William Pitt became the youngest Prime Minister only at the age of 24. He was liked by many and was an amazing administrator who worked for efficiency and reform, to bring together a new generation of amazing administrators. Pitt’s India Act brought important changes in the constitution of the Company.It constituted a department of state in England, also known as the Board of Control, whose purpose served to control the policy of the Court of Directors, introducing the Dual System of Government. It also placed the civil and military government of the Company in due subordination to the Government in England. 

The Act had many perks such as removing many of the faults that the Regulating Act in 1773 had. An example would be that it ended an injustice division of authority in India. By reducing the Governor-General council’s members to three, it removed any chance of there being a tie and the Governor-General would have the final say. The Act also settled the main lines of the Company’s Home and Indian Government. For example, the head of the Board was first the Secretaries of State without a special salary, but after 1773 a special President of the Board was appointed and this officer was ultimately responsible for the government of British India until he was seceded in 1858 by the Secretary of State for India. The Act also was a very skillful measure bearing all the marks of a political compromise. 

However, the Pitt’s India Act had many shortcomings. The first being that it became obvious that the margins between government control and the company’s powers were hazy and personal. The Governor-General had to serve both the East India Company and the British Crown, which was set up for failure. The boundaries between the obligations of the Board of Control and the Court of Directors were unclear. The Governor-General had to make many sporadic decisions that deemed unfair to whoever it wasn’t in favor towards.

See also
Saint Helena Act 1833, third Act following the Pitt's India Act.
East India Company Act

References

Further reading
 Furber, Holden. "The East India Directors in 1784," Journal of Modern History  (Dec., 1933) 5#4, pp. 479–495 in JSTOR, reprints primary sources
 Philips, C. H. "The East India Company 'Interest' and the English Government, 1783-4." Transactions of the Royal Historical Society (Fourth Series) 20 (1937) pp: 83-101.

Great Britain Acts of Parliament 1784
Legislation in British India
British East India Company
1784 in India